Jellett is a surname. Notable people with the surname include:

John Hewitt Jellett (1817–1888), college head, provost of Trinity College, Dublin
Eva Jellett, first woman to graduate in medicine from Trinity College, Dublin
Henry Jellett (father) (died 1901), Irish Anglican priest and Dean of St Patrick's Cathedral, Dublin, father of the gynaecologist
William Morgan Jellett (1857–1936), Irish Unionist Member of Parliament in the UK Parliament
Edwin Jellett (1860–1929), American writer from Germantown, Philadelphia
Henry Jellett (son) (1872–1948), Irish gynaecologist and author, son of the dean
Mainie Jellett (1897–1944), Irish painter
John Holmes Jellett (1905–1971), British civil engineer
Rob Jellett, Canadian local politician – City Councillor in Ottawa, Ontario

See also
Cellettes (disambiguation)
Kellet (disambiguation)